Old Norse philosophy was the philosophy of the early Scandinavians.

Similar to the patterns of thought of other early Germanic peoples, Old Norse philosophy is best attested in the Poetic Edda, particularly Hávamál, which is a poem attributed to Odin, the leading deity in Norse mythology. It emphasized that happiness could only be attained through living a life of virtue, particularly one characterized by the interconnected virtues of wisdom, self-control and personal independence.   Although largely forgotten through the Christianization of Scandinavia, Old Norse philosophy has had a profound impact on the patterns of thought of modern Scandinavians.

Origins
Old Norse philosophy appears to have been a largely indigenous in origin, having developed in relative isolation independent of outside influences. It was probably of similar nature and origin to the patterns of thought of other Germanic peoples.

Scholars, such as Guðmundur Finnbogason and Sveinbjorn Johnson, have pointed out striking similarities between Old Norse philosophy and ancient Greek philosophy, in particular that of Homer and Aristotle. These similarities appear to be a result of independent development, rather than external influence.

Sources

The most important source of Old Norse philosophy is the Poetic Edda, which consists of a number of poems dealing with mythology, heroic legends and moral teachings. According to Lee M. Hollander, the Poetic Edda is as important for the understanding of the ethical views of the Norse and other Germanic peoples as the Vedas are for understanding Indian philosophy and the works of Homer are for understanding ancient Greek philosophy. 

An important part of the Poetic Edda in regard to philosophy is its first poem, the Völuspá. It deals with the beginnings and destiny of mankind and his world. 

Another important part of the Poetic Edda is the Hávamál, a poem on social conduct attributed to Odin, who was the god of war and wisdom and the leading deity in Norse mythology. It is considered the most important source on Old Norse philosophy, and has been referred to as the "Nicomachean Ethics of the North".

The sagas give many glimpses into the Old Norse philosophy of life.

Themes

Similarly to ancient Greek philosophy, Old Norse philosophy was independent of influence from religious dogma, and emphasized that human nature was the foundation on which the pillars of moral philosophy must rest. The aim of life is happiness, which can only be attained by living a life of virtue. 

Virtues emphasized in Old Norse philosophy include independence, self-reliance, loyalty, modesty, hospitality, generosity, compassion, courage, and most importantly, wisdom. Independence was not just attained materially, but was exerted through independence of thought and action as well. Complete independence could only be attained through wisdom, and as in Aristotelian ethics, wisdom could only be acquired through experience. An important source of experience was traveling. The author of the Hávamál points out that while wealth is temporary, wisdom is eternal. Wealth is dismissed as "the most fickle of friends". The ultimate expression of independence was one's ability to act in accordance with wisdom.

The author of Hávamál stresses, like Aristotle, that man is at heart a social being, and that he cannot develop his full potential in isolation. This deep need for fellowship is noted frequently in Old Norse literature. A man was to be a faithful friend, and was not to be on friendly terms with the friends of his enemies. The importance of fulfilling ones personal responsibilities was highly emphasized.

A key feature of a happy man was his ability to get a good rest. This is similar to the sayings of Aristotle. In accordance with Old Norse philosophy, it was foolish to lay awake at night thinking about ones troubles, as this made one less able to deal with the problem the next day.  

Despite belonging to a warrior culture, Old Norse philosophy emphasizes that even the lame, the armless, the deaf, and the blind have a particular place in society.

Old Norse philosophy was strongly fatalistic in that no man could ultimately escape his fate. This belief applied to all classes of society, from kings to thralls. This fatalism encouraged them to live a life of courage and fortitude. This spirit is famously embodied in stanza 77 of Hávamál, which emphasizes that the only lasting thing in the world is the noble name one gains by living a life filled with noble deeds.

Legacy
Although the Norsemen eventually was forced into christianity Christianization of Scandinavia to Christianity and adopted Christian ethics, the spirit of Old Norse philosophy has left a profound legacy among later Scandinavians.

See also
 Rígsþula
 Sigrdrífumál

Notes

References

Bibliography

Further reading

 
 
 
 
 
 
 

 
Norse culture
Ancient philosophy by culture